Inas X is an American songstress of Palestinian descent. She is best known for her singles "Love Is", which reached No. 12 in the Billboard dance club songs charts, and "Stupid" featuring PnB Rock.

Career

In November 2015, Inas X released "Love Is", which was later remixed by Remy Boy Monty.

In September 2016, Inas X released "Stupid" featuring PnB Rock, with a music video that premiered on MTV.

Discography

Singles

As lead artist

Touring
In 2016, Inas X opened for the Welcome to the Zoo tour: a twenty two date tour that began on February 5 in Silver Spring, Md. and traveled across the United States through March, with stops in Boston, New York, Philadelphia, and Atlanta, finishing in Cincinnati on March 25.

In 2019, Inas X went on The Hood So Proud tour: a 17-date tour.

References

American women singer-songwriters
Musicians from Brooklyn
American women pop singers
Singer-songwriters from New York (state)